Gonzalo Martín Viera Davyt (born February 8, 1987 in Paysandú, Uruguay), known as Gonzalo Viera, is a Uruguayan footballer who is playing for Atenas in Uruguayan Segunda División.

Teams

Notes

External links
 
 
 Profile at Tenfield Digital 

1987 births
Living people
Footballers from Paysandú
Uruguayan footballers
Defensor Sporting players
Miramar Misiones players
Cerro Largo F.C. players
Plaza Colonia players
Club Atlético River Plate (Montevideo) players
Cerro Porteño players
Peñarol players
Al-Rayyan SC players
Qatar Stars League players
Uruguayan expatriate footballers
Expatriate footballers in Paraguay
Expatriate footballers in Qatar
Uruguayan expatriate sportspeople in Paraguay
Uruguayan expatriate sportspeople in Qatar
Association football defenders